Aristides Paradissis (1923–2006) was an Australian poet and professor.

Biography
Born in China of Greek parents in Chefoo (now Yantai), Paradissis moved to Shanghai in 1932. He studied at St. Francis Xavier's College and then business and law at the Aurora University (Shanghai). Paradissis arrived in Australia in 1949 and continued his studies at the University of Melbourne and at La Trobe University.  He was senior lecturer in French, Spanish, and European literature at La Trobe University (1967–85).

Works

A Tree at the gate, Sydney, Wentworth Books, 1971 
The City of the Tree, South Melbourne: Taurus Publishing, 1981 
The Bing Book of Verse: Poems in Memory of Bing Crosby, Balwyn, Victoria. 1983 
Dragonsleep, New York, Vantage Press, 1995.
The Balzac Stories: from Paris to Parramatta and other Tales, Melbourne: Adapar Creative Services, 1996 The Shanghai Chronicles: the Day after Pearl Harbor and other stories'', Melbourne: Adapar Creative Services, 1998

Notes
 

1923 births
2006 deaths
Academic staff of La Trobe University
20th-century Australian poets
Australian male poets
20th-century Australian male writers
Chinese emigrants to Australia